was a Japanese diplomat who served as ambassador to the United States and a justice in the Supreme Court of Japan.

Career
Shimoda served as vice foreign minister (a bureaucratic appointment) within the Japanese Foreign Ministry.

He was involved in the revision of the 1951 Security Treaty Between the United States and Japan.

Shimoda served as ambassador to the United States from 28 June 1967 until September 1970. He was a signatory of the Treaty on the Non-Proliferation of Nuclear Weapons on 3 February 1970.

From 12 January 1971 until 2 April 1977, he served as a justice in the Supreme Court of Japan.

Baseball career
He was commissioner of Nippon Professional Baseball from March 1979 until 1985. His predecessor, Toshi Kaneko, resigned after a trade scandal.

Personal life
Shimoda had a wife, Mitsue, a son, and two daughters.

Shimoda died from heart failure on 22 January 1995 in Tokyo.

References

1995 deaths
Ambassadors of Japan to the United States
Ambassadors of Japan to the Soviet Union
Nippon Professional Baseball commissioners
Supreme Court of Japan justices